Devil Story, also known as Il était une fois... le diable, is a 1986 French Nazisploitation horror film written and directed by Bernard Launois. It is his seventh and last feature film. An uneven mixture of the slasher and Euro-gothic genres, it was largely condemned by critics for its incoherent script, technical incompetence, and bad acting. It has since gained a cult following despite its reputation as one of the worst films in history.

Plot
A seemingly deranged murderer in a Schutzstaffel uniform with a disfigured spine and pig-like face terrorises a rural area of Normandy and slaughters whomever he encounters on random—first a couple of campers, then a man asking for directions to the nearest gas station. 

A couple's car breaks down on the road, and they decide to stay at a nearby hotel until they repair their car. The hotel is a modified old castle run by an elderly man and woman. The nervous couple learn from their hosts that the place is cursed.

Reception

In Spinegrinder: The Movies Most Critics Won't Write About, author and critic Clive Davies described the film as "75 mins  of near-catatonic nonsense" with "a dumb, circular ending". Scott Aaron Stine wrote in his The Gorehound's Guide to Splatter Films of the 1980s: "Despite the charming contrivances, [Devil Story] is just one more reason why French cinema rarely ventures or strays into splatter territory".

Home media
The film was released on VHS by a French company called American Vidéo in the late 1980s.

The film was restored in 4K resolution from its 35mm original camera negative and released on Blu-ray by Vinegar Syndrome in 2021. This restored version was screened at the Fantastic Fest, an annual film festival in Austin, Texas, in September 2021.

See also
 List of Vinegar Syndrome releases

References

External links
 
 

1980s French films
French slasher films
French supernatural horror films
Nazi exploitation films